Sponge is an animal of the phylum Porifera.

Sponge may also refer to:

Arts and entertainment
 Sponge (band), an American rock band
 "Sponge", a song by the Brecker Brothers from the 1975 album The Brecker Bros.
 Sponge (TV series), a South Korean TV show
 "The Sponge", a 1995 episode of sitcom Seinfeld
 Private Sponge, a minor character in British TV series Dad's Army
 Sponge, a fictional character from the 1961 novel James and the Giant Peach

Other uses
 Sponge (tool), a porous material used for cleaning impervious surfaces
 Sponge and dough, a breadmaking method
 Sponge cake, a type of cake based on flour, sugar and eggs
 Contraceptive sponge, a method of contraception
 Gauze sponge or surgical sponge, used in surgery and medicine
 SPONGE, a 1960s-era political pressure group
 Sponge function, a class of cryptographic algorithms
 Dave Sapunjis (born 1967), nicknamed "The Sponge", a Canadian Football player

See also
 
 
 Sponger (disambiguation)
 Lists of sponges
 SpongeBob SquarePants, animated series
 Spunge, a British ska punk band 
 Ladyfinger (biscuit), or sponge finger